Schreuders is a Dutch occupational surname. See "Schreuder" for its origin. Notable people with the surname include:

Claudette Schreuders, South African sculptor and painter
Mikel Schreuders, Aruban swimmer

See also
Schreuder

Dutch-language surnames